L'Ascension-de-Patapédia is a municipality in Quebec, Canada.

Being surrounded by large tracts of boreal forest, the place is economically dependent on the forestry industry, as well as some hunting and fishing tourism.

History
While the geographic township of Patapédia was proclaimed in 1881, it was not until 1937 that the village was founded. That same year the Parish of L'Ascension-de-Notre-Seigneur (French for "Ascension of Our Lord") was established. In 1968, the Municipality of L'Ascension-de-Patapédia was incorporated, named after the parish and the township.

Demographics

See also
 List of municipalities in Quebec

References

External links
 municipalité de L’Ascension-de-Patapédia, Matapédia et les Plateaux region

Incorporated places in Gaspésie–Îles-de-la-Madeleine
Municipalities in Quebec